Liftra is an engineering company which specializes in lifting and transport equipment for the Global Wind Turbine industry. Since its inception in 2003, the company has carried out over 800 projects. Liftra's flagship product is the 'Liftra Self-Hoisting Crane' used for major component exchange.

Liftra is based in Aalborg, Denmark, with offices in USA, Spain, China and Poland.

Projects
 Liftra Self-hoisting Crane. WLL 19 Ton. 
 Liftra LT1500 Installation Crane
 Stacking system for tower sections during sea transport.

References

External links
Official Website
Creative Ways To Lift Heavy Objects

Lifting equipment
Construction and civil engineering companies of Denmark
Wind power
Danish companies established in 2008
Construction and civil engineering companies established in 2008